In surface anatomy, a lamella is a thin plate-like structure, often one amongst many lamellae very close to one another, with open space between.  Aside from respiratory organs, they appear in other biological roles including filter feeding and the traction surfaces of geckos.

In fish, gill lamellae are used to increase the surface area in contact with the environment to maximize gas exchange (both to attain oxygen and to expel carbon dioxide) between the water and the blood. In fish gills there are two types of lamellae, primary and secondary. The primary gill lamellae (also called gill filament) extends from the gill arch, and the secondary gill lamellae extends from the primary gill lamellae. Gas exchange primarily occurs at the secondary gill lamellae, where the tissue is notably only one cell layer thick. Furthermore, countercurrent gas exchange at the secondary gill lamellae further maximizes oxygen uptake and carbon dioxide release.

See also
Pecten (biology) – the similar structure in birds

References

Animal anatomy